

Champions

Major League Baseball
World Series: Baltimore Orioles over Los Angeles Dodgers (4–0); Frank Robinson, MVP
All-Star Game, July 12 at Busch Stadium: National League, 2–1 (10 innings); Brooks Robinson, MVP

Other champions
College World Series: Ohio State
Japan Series: Yomiuri Giants over Nankai Hawks (4–2)
Little League World Series: Westbury American, Houston, Texas
Senior League World Series: East Rochester, New York

Awards and honors
Baseball Hall of Fame
Casey Stengel
Ted Williams
Most Valuable Player
Frank Robinson (AL)
Roberto Clemente (NL)
Cy Young Award
Sandy Koufax
Rookie of the Year
Tommie Agee (AL)
Tommy Helms (NL)
Gold Glove Award
Joe Pepitone (1B) (AL) 
Bobby Knoop (2B) (AL) 
Brooks Robinson (3B) (AL) 
Luis Aparicio (SS) (AL) 
Tommie Agee (OF) (AL) 
Al Kaline (OF) (AL) 
Tony Oliva (OF) (AL)
Bill Freehan (C) (AL) 
Jim Kaat (P) (AL)

Statistical leaders

1American League Triple Crown Batting winner
2Major League Triple Crown Pitching winner

Major league baseball final standings

American League final standings

National League final standings

Events

January
January 20 – The Baseball Writers' Association of America voters elect Ted Williams to the Hall of Fame. Williams receives 282 of a possible 302 votes.

February
February 28 – Seeking an unprecedented three-year $1.05 million to be divided evenly, the Los Angeles Dodgers pitchers Sandy Koufax and Don Drysdale begin a joint holdout.

March
March 5 – In what will prove to be one of the more influential off-the-field events in Major League history, United Steelworkers union official Marvin Miller is elected the Executive Director of the Major League Baseball Players Association (MLBPA). Under Miller's guidance, the players' union will make major gains such as salary increases, improvements in pension benefits, and the advent of free agency and salary arbitration. Miller will occupy his position from 1966 to 1982, as the players' union was transformed into one of the strongest unions in the United States.
March 8 – The Special Veterans Committee waives Hall of Fame election rules and inducts Casey Stengel, recently retired manager of the New York Mets.
March 17 – Sandy Koufax and Don Drysdale escalate their threat of retirement by signing movie contracts. On March 30, they will end their 32-day holdout, signing for $130,000 and $105,000 respectively.

April
April 3 – USC pitcher Tom Seaver signs with the New York Mets.  He had been drafted by the Braves, but they had signed him to a minor league contract while he was still in college.  This voided Seaver's remaining eligibility, and voided the contract.  The Mets won a special lottery over Cleveland and Philadelphia to win the right to sign him.
April 11 – Emmett Ashford takes the field to officiate a 5–2 Washington Senators win over the Cleveland Indians at Washington, to become officially the first African-American umpire in Major League history.
April 12 – Over 50,000 fans show up at Atlanta–Fulton County Stadium to watch the Braves first home game in Atlanta. The Braves fall to the Pittsburgh Pirates in 13 innings, 3–2.
April 19 - The California Angels play their first regular-season game in their new ballpark, Anaheim Stadium, in front of 31,660 fans.  White Sox pitcher Tommy John is the 3-2 winner, Marcelino Lopez takes the loss for the home team.  The Angels' Rick Reichardt scores the first run, with a 1-out solo home run in the bottom of the 2nd inning.

May
May 7 – One day after the New York Yankees' record falls to 4–16, general manager Ralph Houk fires Johnny Keane as manager and returns to manage the team himself. Dan Topping, Jr. replaces Houk as general manager. Houk had managed the Yankees to three consecutive American League pennants from 1961 to 1963 and a World Series title during the first two of those years, but his second stint will have a far less than successful beginning.
May 8
The San Francisco Giants trade first baseman/outfielder Orlando Cepeda to the St. Louis Cardinals for pitcher Ray Sadecki. That same day, the Giants defeat the Cardinals 10–5 in the final game at the old Busch Stadium.
Frank Robinson of the Baltimore Orioles hits what will be the only home run hit out of Memorial Stadium. The shot comes against Luis Tiant in the first inning of the Orioles' 8–3 victory in the second game of a doubleheader against the Cleveland Indians.
May 12 – With 46,048 spectators in attendance for the first game at the new Busch Memorial Stadium, the St. Louis Cardinals defeat the Atlanta Braves in 12 innings, 4–3, behind a single RBI by Lou Brock. Braves outfielder Felipe Alou delivers a pair of home runs.
May 14 – The San Francisco Giants' Willie Mays hits his then National League record 512th home run – topping another Giant, Mel Ott. San Francisco beats the Los Angeles Dodgers, 6–1, at Candlestick Park.

June
June 7 – The Kansas City Athletics use the second overall pick to draft Arizona State outfielder Reggie Jackson.
June 9 – At Metropolitan Stadium, the Minnesota Twins rock the Kansas City Athletics, 9–4, with five home runs off the bats of Rich Rollins, Zoilo Versalles, Tony Oliva, Don Mincher and Harmon Killebrew in the seventh inning. These five home runs still stand as a Major League record for the most home runs batted in a single inning, and were hit off starter Catfish Hunter (two), reliever Paul Lindblad (two), and reliever John Wyatt.
June 10 – Sonny Siebert of the Cleveland Indians no-hits the Washington Senators 2–0 at Cleveland Stadium.

July
July 3 – Atlanta pitcher Tony Cloninger hits two grand slams in a game against the Giants; he thus becomes the first National League player and only pitcher in Major League history to do so. His nine RBI in a game also is a record for pitchers.
July 9 – Astroturf is finally installed in the Astrodome outfield.
July 12 – At St. Louis, Maury Wills' 10th-inning single scores Tim McCarver, as the National League wins 2–1 over the American League in the All-Star Game, but AL Brooks Robinson's stellar game (three hits, eight fielding chances) earns him the MVP honors.
July 21 – Against the Washington Senators in D.C., Minnesota Twins pitcher Jim Merritt strikes out twelve in a 1–0 shutout win.  Seven of the twelve are consecutive, in the middle innings, to set an American League record.  The final out in Merritt's string is his mound opponent Jim Hannan, who ironically had struck out Merritt just prior to the strikeout streak beginning.
July 25 – During his Hall of Fame induction speech, Ted Williams publicly calls on baseball to induct former great players from the Negro leagues. He specifically calls for the induction of Josh Gibson and Satchel Paige. Williams' wish becomes true 5 years later when Satchel Paige is inducted into the Hall of Fame.
July 27 – At Dodger Stadium, Sandy Koufax of the Los Angeles Dodgers faces Jim Bunning of the Philadelphia Phillies in the first matchup of perfect game pitchers. The Dodgers defeat the Phillies 2–1 in 12 innings with neither pitcher involved in the decision; both pitchers had pitched 11 innings with Koufax giving up four hits and striking out 16 and Bunning six hits and striking out 12.
July 29 – Mickey Mantle homers against Bruce Howard of the White Sox. It is his 494th career home run and he passes Lou Gehrig for 6th place on the all-time list. The Yankees and Al Downing beat the Chicago White Sox, 2–1.

August
August 15 – The Orioles left-handed slugger Boog Powell hits 3 opposite-field homers over the left-field Green Monster at Fenway Park. Powell has 13 total bases in the game, won by Baltimore, 4–2, in 11 innings.
August 29 – The Detroit Tigers' Denny McLain wins his 16th start of the season, even though he doesn't do it that way.  He throws 229 pitches, walks 9, and allows 8 hits. However, he strikes out 11 in a 6–3 win over the Baltimore Orioles.

September
September 11 – Pat Jarvis became the first strikeout victim of Nolan Ryan's career.
September 12 – Ron Perranoski of the Los Angeles Dodgers fans the first six batters he faces and earns a 3–2 win over the New York Mets. With the help of second baseman Ron Hunt, Mets rookie shortstop Bud Harrelson picks off Lou Johnson with the hidden ball trick in the sixth.
September 18 – At Yankee Stadium, the New York Yankees fall to last place after losing to the Minnesota Twins 5–3 in 10 innings on pinch-hitter Bob Allison's three-run home run. The Yankees will stay in the cellar for the remainder of the season, finishing there for the first time since .
September 22 – The Baltimore Orioles beat the host Kansas City Athletics, 6–1, to clinch their first American League pennant since the St. Louis Browns moved to Baltimore. Both Brooks Robinson and Frank Robinson have two runs batted in.
September 25 – Against the Los Angeles Dodgers at Wrigley Field, in a battle of Jewish-American left-handers, Ken Holtzman of the Chicago Cubs has a no-hitter broken up on a Dick Schofield single leading off the ninth. Schofield later scores on a Maury Wills single; the two hits are all Holtzman allows in a 2–1 victory over the Dodgers in what will be Sandy Koufax's final regular-season loss. The Cubs score their two runs in the first as Don Kessinger, who had walked leading off the inning, scores on Glenn Beckert's triple one batter later; Beckert later scores as Jim Lefebvre drops Ernie Banks' pop-up for what would have been the third out.
September 26 – Willie McCovey hits his 200th career home run, helping the San Francisco Giants beat the Atlanta Braves, 8–2.

October
October 2 – In the second game of a doubleheader at Connie Mack Stadium, the Los Angeles Dodgers defeat the Philadelphia Phillies 6–3 as Sandy Koufax bests Jim Bunning in what will be the final regular-season game of Koufax's career. Despite giving up the three runs in the ninth inning, Koufax goes the distance and strikes out Jackie Brandt for the final out.
October 9 – In Game Four of the World Series, Dave McNally wrapped up a brilliant pitching display, and the first World Series Championship for the Baltimore Orioles, with a four-hit, 1–0 shutout against the Los Angeles Dodgers. Series MVP Frank Robinson hits a home run off Don Drysdale for the only run of the game and gave Baltimore a sweep of the defending World Series Champion Dodgers. The shutout completes a World Series record 33 scoreless innings pitched by Orioles pitchers, beginning with Moe Drabowsky pitching 6 innings in relief of McNally in Game One, followed by shutouts by Jim Palmer and Wally Bunker—neither of whom had pitched a shutout during the regular season.  The Orioles are the last of the original eight American League franchises to win their first World Series.

November
November 12 – The Los Angeles Dodgers complete an 18-game tour of Japan with a 9–8–1 record. The eight losses are the most for an MLB club touring the Far East.
November 18 – Sandy Koufax announces his retirement from baseball due to arthritis in his left elbow. Six years later he would become the youngest player elected to the Hall of Fame.
November 23 – Chicago White Sox outfielder Tommie Agee is voted American League Rookie of the Year, gathering 16 of the 18 votes. Kansas City Athletics pitcher Jim Nash gets the other two votes. Agee had been brought up briefly the past four seasons before finding a permanent spot in 1966.
November 25 – Cincinnati Reds infielder Tommy Helms is voted National League Rookie of the Year with 12 of 20 first place votes, with the others going to Sonny Jackson (3), Tito Fuentes (2), Randy Hundley (1), Larry Jaster (1) and Cleon Jones (1).
November 29 – The New York Mets trade outfielder Jim Hickman and second baseman Ron Hunt to the Los Angeles Dodgers for outfielders Tommy Davis and Derrell Griffith. Hickman had been the last of the Original Mets.

December
December 1 – The Los Angeles Dodgers send former National League stolen base king Maury Wills to the Pittsburgh Pirates in exchange for infielders Bob Bailey and Gene Michael. Wills upset the Dodgers when he left the team during its recent tour of Japan.
December 31 The Atlanta Braves make a trade with the Houston Astros. The Braves send Houston Sandy Alomar SR, Arnie Umbach and Eddie Mathews in exchange for Outfielder Dave Nicholson and pitcher Bob Bruce. The trade ends Matthews' 15-year tenure with the Braves franchise. Matthews is the only player who played with the Braves in Boston, Milwaukee and Atlanta.

Births

January
January   5 – Steve Shifflett
January 16 – Jack McDowell
January 19 – Anthony Young
January 21 – Chris Hammond
January 25 – Richie Lewis

February
February   1 – Darrin Chapin
February   1 – Eduardo Zambrano
February   3 – Paul McClellan
February   5 – Ray Giannelli
February   7 – Stu Cole
February 12 – Jeff Pico
February 13 – Jerry Browne
February 15 – Mélido Pérez
February 20 – Derek Lilliquist
February 24 – René Arocha
February 24 – Rod Brewer
February 27 – Chris Howard
February 27 – Pete Smith

March
March   2 – Leo Gómez
March   3 – Francisco de la Rosa
March   4 – Andy Mota
March   5 – Kevin L. Brown
March   6 – Joe Hall
March   6 – Anthony Telford
March   7 – Mauro Gozzo
March 10 – Mike Timlin
March 12 – Mike Ignasiak
March 19 – Tony Scruggs
March 20 – Dino Ebel
March 20 – Blas Minor
March 21 – Roger Smithberg
March 22 – Sean Berry
March 23 – Mike Remlinger
March 25 – Tom Glavine
March 29 – Eric Gunderson
March 30 – Terry Bross

April
April   7 – Freddie Benavides
April   8 – Alex Sanchez
April 11 – Steve Scarsone
April 13 – Wes Chamberlain
April 14 – David Justice
April 14 – Greg Maddux
April 14 – Greg Myers
April 20 – Tony Perezchica
April 21 – Chris Donnels
April 22 – Mickey Morandini
April 25 – Darren Holmes
April 25 – Erik Pappas
April 27 – Bob Ayrault
April 27 – Eric Hillman
April 28 – Jim Poole
April 29 – Ed Correa
April 29 – John Vander Wal

May
May   1 – Armando Reynoso
May   5 – Reggie Williams
May 12 – Rafael Bournigal
May 13 – Chris Nichting
May 17 – Jack Voigt
May 19 – Jim Campbell
May 22 – José Mesa
May 25 – Bill Haselman
May 25 – Dave Hollins
May 27 – John Jaha
May 28 – Mike Maksudian

June
June   5 – Bill Spiers
June   7 – Heathcliff Slocumb
June   7 – Trevor Wilson
June 13 – Scott Coolbaugh
June 14 – Randy Tomlin
June 15 – Dave Liddell
June 17 – Shawn Abner
June 18 – Sandy Alomar Jr.
June 22 – Jorge Brito
June 27 – Jeff Conine
June 28 – Frank Bolick
June 28 – Shawn Jeter
June 29 – Peter Hoy
June 30 – Paul Schrieber

July
July   2 – Tim Spehr
July   3 – Moisés Alou
July   5 – Dave Eiland
July   6 – Jeremy Hernandez
July   6 – Darrin Winston
July   7 – Dave Burba
July   7 – Jeff Shaw
July 11 – Efraín Valdez
July 15 – Brett Merriman
July 19 – Tim Leiper
July 19 – David Segui
July 28 – Derek Lee
July 30 – Mike Anderson

August
August   2 – Tim Wakefield
August   4 – Jeff Johnson
August   5 – Jerry Nielsen
August   6 – Stan Belinda
August   8 – John Hudek
August   9 – Bob Scanlan
August 10 – Gerald Williams
August 12 – Dean Hartgraves
August 14 – Dana Allison
August 15 – Scott Brosius
August 15 – Dan Walters
August 16 – Steve Foster
August 16 – Terry Shumpert
August 17 – Tony Barron
August 18 – Bob Zupcic
August 19 – Woody Williams
August 21 – John Wetteland
August 22 – Scott Chiamparino
August 24 – Dean Wilkins
August 25 – Albert Belle
August 26 – Víctor Rosario
August 31 – Jeff Frye

September
September   2 – Terry Jorgensen
September   8 – Mike Dyer
September 10 – Riccardo Ingram
September 14 – Mike Draper
September 15 – Doug Simons
September 23 – Pete Harnisch
September 24 – Chris George
September 24 – Bernard Gilkey
September 24 – Kevin Koslofski
September 28 – César Hernández

October
October   3 – Darrin Fletcher
October   3 – Scott Taylor
October   4 – Tim Mauser
October   4 – Mike Walker
October   6 – Archi Cianfrocco
October   8 – Jay Gainer
October 10 – Francisco Cabrera
October 11 – Gregg Olson
October 12 – Jorge Pedre
October 18 – Carlos Maldonado
October 18 – Alan Mills
October 19 – Dave Veres
October 20 – Jonathan Hurst
October 21 – Kevin Batiste
October 25 – Mike Harkey
October 28 – Tim Bogar
October 28 – Juan Guzmán
October 29 – Pat Combs
October 30 – Mark Ettles
October 31 – Brian Keyser

November
November   1 – Bob Wells
November   2 – Orlando Merced
November   4 – Brian Drahman
November   7 – William Suero
November   7 – Andy Tomberlin
November 11 – Dave Telgheder
November 14 – Curt Schilling
November 16 – Tim Scott
November 17 – Andy Fletcher
November 17 – Jeff Nelson
November 18 – Ron Coomer
November 18 – Howard Farmer
November 18 – Eddie Tucker
November 19 – Jeff Hartsock
November 25 – Mark Whiten

December
December   1 – Greg McMichael
December   1 – Larry Walker
December   4 – Darrell Sherman
December   5 – Tony Beasley
December   6 – Terry McDaniel
December 10 – Norberto Martin
December 10 – Mel Rojas
December 18 – Eric Cooper
December 19 – Joe Slusarski
December 20 – Jeff Mutis
December 21 – Paul Swingle
December 24 – Mo Sanford
December 29 – Luis de los Santos
December 30 – Kevin Long

Deaths

January
January   1 – Oscar Dugey, 78, light-hitting infielder who appeared in 193 games for the Boston Braves and Philadelphia Phillies between 1913 and 1920; member of 1914 world-champion "Miracle Braves" and 1915 Phillies, who captured their first National League pennant.
January   3 – Luther Bonin, 77, outfielder for St. Louis of the American League and Buffalo of the "outlaw" Federal League who played 21 games in 1913–1914.
January 10 – Andy Reese, 61, played every position but pitcher and catcher—although primarily a left fielder and third baseman—over the course of his 331-game career with the New York Giants of 1927–1930.
January 14 – Sidney Weil, 74, principal owner of the Cincinnati Reds from 1929 to 1933.
January 15 – Stover McIlwain, 26, pitcher who appeared in two games as a teenager for the Chicago White Sox in 1957 and 1958.
January 15 – Walt Walsh, 68, pinch runner for two games with the 1920 Philadelphia Phillies.
January 20 – Leslie O'Connor, 76, lawyer and baseball executive; assistant to Commissioners K. M. Landis (1921–1944) and Happy Chandler (1945); in between, acting Commissioner of Baseball as chairman of the MLB Advisory Council (1944–1945); subsequently general manager of Chicago White Sox (1945–1948) and president of Pacific Coast League (1956–1959).
January 29 – Homer Summa, 67, right fielder who collected a .302 average over ten seasons with the Pittsburgh Pirates (1920), Cleveland Indians (1922–1928) and Philadelphia Athletics (1929–1930); member of two-time world champion Athletics.
January 31 – Pat Donahue, 81, catcher who got into 119 games between 1908 and 1910 for the Boston Red Sox, Philadelphia Athletics and Cleveland Naps.

February
Februaru   2 – Ted Shaw, 59, left-hander who pitched for the Detroit Stars of the Negro National League from 1928 to 1930.
February   4 – Irvin Brooks, 74, outfielder for the Brooklyn Royal Giants of the Eastern Colored League from 1923 to 1927.
February   4 – Mike Milosevich, 51, shortstop in 124 games for the 1944–1945 New York Yankees.
February 10 – Willie Burns, 50, pitcher who hurled for seven different clubs over five seasons in the Negro leagues between 1935 and 1945.
February 14 – Jack Coffey, 79, infielder who played from 1909 to 1918 for the Boston Doves, Detroit Tigers and Boston Red Sox who was also a longtime baseball head coach at Fordham University.
February 14 – Bill Stumpf, 73, infielder for New York of the American League, playing in 54 career games during 1912 and 1913.
February 17 – Finners Quinlan, 78, outfielder who played 13 games for the 1913 St. Louis Cardinals and 42 more for the 1915 Chicago White Sox.
February 18 – Marty McManus, 65, second baseman and third baseman who played 1,831 games from 1920 through 1934 for the St. Louis Browns, Detroit Tigers, Boston Red Sox and Boston Braves; player-manager of the Red Sox in 1932 and 1933. 
February 19 – Ed Mayweather, 56, two-time All-Star first baseman who played for three Negro leagues clubs, principally the Kansas City Monarchs and St. Louis Stars, between 1937 and 1942.
February 20 – Harry Geisel, 77, American League umpire from 1925 to 1942 who worked in 2,554 regular-season games, two MLB All-Star Games (1935, 1938), and three World Series (1930, 1934, 1936).
February 25 – Garland Braxton, 65, left-handed pitcher in 282 games for the Boston Braves, New York Yankees, Washington Senators, Chicago White Sox and St. Louis Browns between 1921 and 1933; led American League in earned run average (2.51) in 1928.

March
March   6 – Dick Whitworth, 70, pitcher for the Chicago American Giants of the Negro National League in 1922 and 1924.
March   9 – Aaron Robinson, 50, All-Star catcher (1947) for the New York Yankees who succeeded Bill Dickey, then was replaced by Yogi Berra as the Bombers' starting receiver in 1948; played for the Chicago White Sox, Detroit Tigers and Boston Red Sox from 1948 through 1951.
March   9 – Elmer Steele, 81, pitcher in 75 games for Boston of the American League and Pittsburgh and Brooklyn of the National League between 1907 and 1911.
March 14 – Lee Magee, 76, outfielder-second baseman for seven big-league teams, principally the St. Louis Cardinals and New York Yankees, in the nine seasons of 1911–1919, appearing in 1,015 games; player-manager of Brooklyn Tip-Tops of the "outlaw" Federal League for most of 1915; known for bitter battles with owners, and accused them of "blackballing" him after 1919 season; implicated, with Hal Chase, in gambling allegations investigated by Cook County grand jury called in 1920 to probe the "Black Sox" scandal.
March 15 – Chappie Geygan, 62, shortstop and third baseman who played in 40 games for the Boston Red Sox between 1924 and 1926.
March 18 – Frank Bennett, 61, pitcher in five games for the Boston Red Sox (1927–1928).
March 19 – Army Cooper, 66, pitcher who went 27–10 (3.98 ERA) for the Kansas City Monarchs of the Negro National League between 1928 and 1930.
March 20 – "Jughandle Johnny" Morrison, 70, pitcher who won 103 career games for the Pittsburgh Pirates (1920–1927) and Brooklyn Robins (1929–1930); member of 1925 world champions.
March 23 – Fred T. Long, 70, outfielder who played for Detroit (1920–1921, 1926) and Indianapolis (1925) of the Negro National League, then became a longtime and legendary head football coach at four historically black colleges in Texas and member of multiple college football and coaches halls of fame.
March 25 – Bill Morrisette, 71, pitcher who worked in 13 total games for the 1915–1916 Philadelphia Athletics and 1920 Detroit Tigers.
March 31 – Grady Adkins, 68, pitcher in 67 games for the 1928–1929 Chicago White Sox.

April
April   1 – John Sullivan, 76, outfielder who got into 162 total games for the Boston Braves (1920–1921) and Chicago Cubs (1921).
April   4 – Herb McQuaid, 67, relief pitcher for 1923 Cincinnati Reds and 1926 New York Yankees who made 29 career mound appearances.
April   5 – Sam Dodge, 76, pitcher in four games for the 1921–1922 Boston Red Sox.
April   6 – Rolla Mapel, 76, left-handed pitcher in four games for 1919 St. Louis Browns.
April   7 – Ambrose Reid, 67, outfielder, second baseman and third baseman in the Negro leagues between 1921 and 1932 who played primarily for the Atlantic City Bacharach Giants of the Eastern Colored circuit.
April 12 – Joe Harris, 84, pitcher with the Boston Americans from 1905–1907; posted a 2–21 won–lost record in 1906, and followed that in 1907 by going 0–7; his career mark was 3–30 (.091 winning percentage) with a 3.35 earned run average.
April 19 – Maury Kent, 80, pitcher in 23 games during 1912–1913 for Brooklyn of the National League; coached multiple sports (especially baseball) in U.S. colleges (notably Northwestern University) until 1943. 
April 22 – Lou Finney, 55, outfielder-first baseman who played in 1,270 games between 1931 and 1947 for the Philadelphia Athletics, Boston Red Sox, St. Louis Browns and Philadelphia Phillies.
April 25 – Art Decatur, 72, pitcher who appeared in 153 games between 1922 and 1927 for the Brooklyn Robins and Philadelphia Phillies.

May
May   4 – Bob Elliott, 49, seven-time National League All-Star third baseman and 1947 NL Most Valuable Player whose 15-year MLB career (1939–1953) was primarily spent with the Pittsburgh Pirates and Boston Braves; manager of 1960 Kansas City Athletics.
May   7 – Bing Miller, 71, outfielder who batted .311 in 1,820 games between 1921 and 1936 for the Washington Senators, Philadelphia Athletics, St. Louis Browns and Boston Red Sox, who won two World Series with the Athletics in 1929 and 1930; later a longtime coach.
May 14 – Tom Connolly, 73, third baseman/outfielder who appeared in 50 games for the 1915 Washington Senators.
May 22 – Peewee Hauser, 77, -tall shortstop for the 1910–1913 St. Louis Cardinals and 1915 Chicago Whales (Federal League).
May 26 – Bill Rumler, 75, catcher, outfielder and frequent pinch hitter who appeared in 139 games for the St. Louis Browns in 1914 and 1916–1917.
May 29 – Hippo Vaughn, 78, left-handed pitcher who won 178 games for the New York Highlanders (1908; 1910–1912), Washington Senators (1912) and Chicago Cubs (1913–1921), including five 20-win-or-more seasons for the Cubs; known for the May 2, 1917, game in which he and Cincinnati pitcher Fred Toney each threw nine innings of no-hit ball; the "double no-hitter" ended in the tenth when Vaughn surrendered two hits and an unearned run, and Toney notched a 1–0 no-hit victory.

June
June   1 – Dick Cox, 70, outfielder who hit .314 with 261 hits in 246 games for the 1925–1926 Brooklyn Robins, his only two MLB campaigns.
June   2 – Joe Casey, 78, reserve catcher/center fielder who appeared in 50 big-league games for the 1909–1911 Detroit Tigers and 1918 Washington Senators.
June   8 – Jake Munch, 75, outfielder-first baseman in eight games for the 1918 Philadelphia Athletics.
June   9 – Wilmer Ewell, 70, catcher who played 32 games from 1925–1926 for Indianapolis of the Negro National League.
June 11 – Rube Curry, 67, pitcher who hurled in the Negro leagues between 1920 and 1933, notably for the Kansas City Monarchs, and member of three Negro World Series championship teams.
June 14 – Bill Walker, 62, left-handed pitcher for the New York Giants (1927–1932) and St. Louis Cardinals (1933–1936); member of 1934 world champion "Gashouse Gang"; two-time National League earned-run average champion, 1929 (3.09) and 1931 (2.26).
June 18 – Rollie Naylor, 74, pitcher for a succession of execrable Philadelphia Athletics teams, in 1917 and from 1919 through June 1924; lost 23 games in 1920.
June 20 – Denney Wilie, 75, outfielder/pinch hitter for the 1911–1912 St. Louis Cardinals and 1915 Cleveland Indians.
June 25 – Mose Solomon, 65, first baseman in two games for the 1923 New York Giants; minor-league slugger nicknamed "The Rabbi of Swat" and "The Jewish Babe Ruth."
June 26 – Lil Stoner, 67, pitcher in 229 games in the majors, 217 of them with the Detroit Tigers, between 1922 and 1931.
June 27 – Marty Krug, 77, third baseman who played for the Boston Red Sox (1912) and Chicago Cubs (1922); later, an MLB scout and minor-league manager.

July
July   1 – Goldie Rapp, 72, third baseman who appeared in 276 games for the New York Giants and Philadelphia Phillies from 1921 to 1923.
July   2 – Ormond Sampson, 56, Bahamian-born shortstop/outfielder for four Negro leagues clubs between 1932 and 1941.
July   5 – Pete Fox, 57, outfielder for the Detroit Tigers and Boston Red Sox who batted .298 lifetime in 1,461 games between 1933 and 1945; hit .327 for Tigers with 18 hits in 14 World Series games (1934, 1935, 1940), winning a ring in 1935.
July   6 – Sad Sam Jones, 73, pitcher who enjoyed a 22-year career (1914–1935) in the majors, posting a 229–217 record in 647 games for the Cleveland Indians, Boston Red Sox, New York Yankees, Washington Senators, St. Louis Browns and Chicago White Sox; member of 1918 world champion Boston and 1923 world champion New York clubs. 
July   9 – Mule Suttles, 66, All-Star first baseman of the Negro leagues who hit the first home run in the East-West All-Star game.
July 11 – Barney Lutz, 50, former minor league outfielder and manager, died while scouting a New York–Penn League game for the Baltimore Orioles.
July 12 – Edgar Wesley, 75, first baseman for three Negro National League clubs, principally the Detroit Stars, between 1920 and 1927; led NNL in home runs (11) in 1920 and batting average (.404) in 1925.
July 13 – Rip Vowinkel, 81, pitcher who worked in five games for the 1905 Cincinnati Reds.
July 15 – Tommy McMillan, 78, shortstop for the Brooklyn Superbas, Cincinnati Reds and New York Highlanders between 1908 and 1912; played 22 years in minor leagues.
July 16 – Elmer Yoter, 66, third baseman for the Philadelphia Athletics, Cleveland Indians and Chicago Cubs in 36 games over four seasons between 1921 and 1928; longtime minor league manager and MLB scout. 
July 22 – Frank Delahanty, 83, light-hitting outfielder for New York (1905–1906) and Cleveland (1907) of the American League and Buffalo (1914) and Pittsburgh (1914–1915) of the "outlaw" Federal League; one of five Delahanty brothers to appear in the major leagues.
July 28 – Hal Dixon, 46, National League umpire from 1953 through 1959; in his final season, led NL in ejections (13) and worked in 1959 World Series; during career, he officiated in 989 league games and 1957 All-Star tilt.

August
August   1 – Hank Gowdy, 76, catcher who appeared in 1,050 games in the National League, 852 with Boston and remaining 198 with New York; member of 1914 "Miracle Braves", when he helped win the World Series by batting .545 with six hits (five for extra bases) in four games; later a longtime coach; the only MLB player to have served in both World Wars.
August   3 – Earl Blackburn, 73, spare catcher for four NL teams, chiefly the Boston Braves, who got into 71 games over five seasons spanning 1912 to 1917.
August   4 – Pug Cavet, 76, pitcher whose 23-year professional career included 49 games for the Detroit Tigers (1911 and 1914–1915).
August   8 – Taylor Sanford, 57, former minor-league infielder and manager and successful college baseball coach, who won 1955 NCAA baseball championship at the helm of the Wake Forest Demon Deacons.
August 10 – Chuck Dressen, 71, incumbent manager of the Detroit Tigers since June 18, 1963, and pilot of four other MLB clubs dating to 1934; led the Brooklyn Dodgers to pennants in 1952–1953; in his playing days, a third baseman who appeared in 646 games for the Cincinnati Reds and New York Giants between 1925 and 1933; also a coach for a dozen seasons between 1939 and 1959; member of three World Series champions (1933, 1947, 1959).
August 11 – Ellis Ryan, 62, principal owner of the Cleveland Indians from 1949 to 1952.
August 15 – George J. Burns, 76, outfielder who played in 1,844 games between 1911 and 1925, primarily with the New York Giants; led the National League in runs and walks five times each.
August 17 – Bill Allington, 62, manager who won four Championship Titles in the All-American Girls Professional Baseball League.
August 24 – Wheezer Dell, 80, pitcher who appeared in 92 career games for the 1912 St. Louis Cardinals and 1915–1917 Brooklyn Robins.
August 25 – Ray Rolling, 79, second baseman in five games for 1912 St. Louis Cardinals.
August 25 – Sam Zoldak, 47, left-handed pitcher who appeared in 250 games for the St. Louis Browns, Cleveland Indians and Philadelphia Athletics between 1944 and 1952.
August 29 – Al DeVormer, 75, catcher for the Chicago White Sox, New York Yankees, Boston Red Sox and New York Giants between 1918 and 1927.
August 29 – Bobby Schang, 79, catcher whose 17-year pro career (1912–1928) was punctuated by getting into 82 major-league games with the Pittsburgh Pirates (1914–1915), New York Giants (1915) and St. Louis Cardinals (1927); brother of Wally Schang.

September
September   2 – Bill McCabe, 73, reserve outfielder and frequent pinch runner who appeared in 106 games for the 1918–1920 Chicago Cubs and 1920 Brooklyn Robins; appeared in 1918 and 1920 World Series.
September   5 – Frank Withrow, 75, backup catcher for the 1920 and 1922 Philadelphia Phillies.
September   9 – Bob Kelley, 48, Los Angeles sportscaster and voice of the expansion Angels during their maiden 1961 season in the American League; longtime voice of NFL Rams.
September 12 – Parson Perryman, 77, pitcher in 24 games for the 1915 St. Louis Browns.
September 12 – Bill Summers, 70, American League umpire from 1933 to 1959 who worked in eight World Series and a record seven All-Star games.
September 13 – Ralph Comstock, 78, pitched in the 1910s for the Detroit Tigers, Boston Red Sox, Pittsburgh Rebels (of the "outlaw" Federal League) and Pittsburgh Pirates.
September 29 – Jack Rowan, 80, pitcher for four MLB teams over seven seasons between 1906 and 1914, chiefly as a member of the Cincinnati Reds.

October
October   2 – Jumbo Brown, 59, a  pitcher who worked in 249 games, 226 in relief, for five MLB teams between 1925 and 1941; led National League in saves (not then an official statistic) in 1940 and 1941.
October   4 – Mike Tresh, 52, catcher for the Chicago White Sox and Cleveland Indians from 1938 to 1949 and the father of New York Yankees' Tom Tresh.
October   5 – John Reese, 71, outfielder who played in the Negro National League between 1920 and 1931, chiefly for the St. Louis Stars and Chicago American Giants.
October   7 – George Magerkurth, 77, colorful and combative National League umpire from 1929 to 1947 who worked in 2,814 NL games, four World Series and two All-Star games; ejected 101 men over the course of his career.
October 10 – Patsy Gharrity, 74, catcher who appeared in 676 big-leagues games for the Washington Senators (1916–1923; 1929–1930); longtime batterymate of Hall of Fame pitcher Walter Johnson.
October 11 – Red Smith, 76, solid third baseman for Brooklyn and Boston of the National League from 1911 through 1919; in his only year with Boston, he was a member of the 1914 World Series champion "Miracle Braves".
October 17 – Bob Swift, 51, MLB catcher (1940–1953) for the St. Louis Browns, Philadelphia Athletics and Detroit Tigers who was behind the plate when the diminutive Eddie Gaedel made his famous appearance as a pinch hitter on August 19, 1951; later, a coach for three MLB teams and acting manager of the Tigers for parts of the 1965 and 1966 seasons.
October 23 – Fred Fussell, 71, left-handed pitcher who worked in 80 games for the Chicago Cubs (1922–1923) and Pittsburgh Pirates (1928–1929).
October 23 – Jack Peerson, 56, shortstop/pinch hitter who batted .321 in 55 plate appearances for the 1935–1936 Philadelphia Athletics.
October 26 – Bill "Crungy" Cronin, 63, catcher in 126 games for 1928–1931 Boston Braves, who played professionally for 23 seasons.
October 29 – Al Grabowski, 65, pitcher who appeared in 39 total games for 1929–1930 St. Louis Cardinals.
October 30 – "Kewpie Dick" Barrett, 60, pitcher who appeared in 141 MLB games between 1933 and 1945 for four teams; legendary minor-league hurler, where he won 317 career games; seven-time 20-game winner for Seattle of the Pacific Coast League; The Sporting News' Minor League Player of the Year in 1942.
October 30 – Rex Cecil, 50, pitcher in 18 games for the 1944–1945 Boston Red Sox, including the Bosox' starting assignment on Opening Day 1945.
October 30 – Alex Pearson, 89, pitcher in 15 career games for the St. Louis Cardinals (1902) and Cleveland Naps (1903).
October 31 – Elmer Johnson, 82, backup catcher for the 1914 New York Giants.

November
November   2 – Lew Moren, 83, pitcher who worked in 141 games for the Pittsburgh Pirates (two total appearances in 1903–1904) and Philadelphia Phillies (139 games between 1907 and 1910).
November   7 – Rube Bressler, 72, one of only a few players in major league baseball history to successfully convert from a pitcher to a position player as a first baseman/outfielder, who played for the Philadelphia Athletics and Phillies, Brooklyn Dodgers, Cincinnati Reds, and St. Louis Cardinals between 1914 and 1931.
November 12 – Mike Loan, 72, catcher who got into one MLB game on September 18, 1912, for his hometown Philadelphia Phillies.
November 21 – Hack Miller, 53, catcher who appeared in only seven total games for the 1944–1945 Detroit Tigers, but homered in his first major-league at bat.
November 24 – Tom Gulley, 66, outfielder who played briefly with 1923–1924 Cleveland Indians and 1926 Chicago White Sox.
November 29 – Richard King, 62, first baseman who saw infrequent action as a member of the Cincinnati and Indianapolis Clowns of the Negro American League in 1943, 1945 and 1948.

December
December   4 – Joe Willis, 76, left-hander who hurled for two of St. Louis' MLB teams, appearing in one game for the American League Browns (1911) and in 40 contests for the National League Cardinals (1911–1913).
December   8 – Bill Bolden, 73, pitcher who made three appearances for the 1919 St. Louis Cardinals.
December 11 – Cliff Fannin, 42, pitcher in 164 games for the St. Louis Browns between 1945 and 1952.
December 16 – Morrow Massey, 66, outfielder who batted .310 in his brief, 17-game tenure with the 1930 Louisville Black Caps of the Negro National League.
December 20 – Doc Farrell, 64, utility infielder for six different teams between 1925 and 1935, including the Yankees' 1932 World Series champions.

Sources

External links
Baseball Almanac - Major League Baseball Players Who Died in 1966
Baseball Reference - 1966 MLB Season Summary  
ESPN - 1966 MLB Season History